Vadim Gennadyevich Gratshev (1 May 196317 October 2006) was one of world leading experts in palaeoentomology. Vadim graduated from the Moscow State Pedagogical Institute in 1987 and taught biology at a high school for three years until 1989. Then he decided to pursue academic science and joined the Laboratory of Arthropods at the Paleontological Institute of Russian Academy of Sciences in 1991, first as a Kuperwood Fellow of the Academy of Natural Sciences, and since 1994 as a full-time researcher. Weevils and dryopoids were always his main passion, although his area of interests extended far beyond that. He produced over 20 scientific papers, including an outstanding comparative study of the hindwing venation of the superfamily Curculionoidea published in co-authorship with Vladimir Zherikhin. Being a keen field researcher, he participated in numerous expeditions to the Maritime Province and Sakhalin Island, Kuznetskii Alatau, Novosibirsk Region, Armenia, Azerbaijan, Georgia, Tajikistan, Turkmenia, and Ukraine. The material he collected on his trip to the Drakensberg and Zululand in 2005 inspired him to commence a new project on Afrotropical Elmidae and Anthribidae. Being an optimistic, cheerful multi-talented individual with subtle sense of humour, he did not restrict his interests to extinct and extant beetles. He was an expert in noble orchids, aquarium design and raising geckos, and published several papers on those topics. He was a skillful wood-carver, and his knowledge of Japanese history and literature was not amateur.

Selected References

Nikitsky N.B., Lawrence J.F., Kirejtshuk A.G., Gratshev V.G. 1993. A new family, Decliniidae fam. n., from the Russian Far East and its taxonomic relationships (Coleoptera, Polyphaga). Russian Entomological Journal 2 (5-6): 3–10.
Zherikhin V.V., Gratshev V.G. 1995. A comparative study of the hind wing venation of the superfamily Curculionoidea with phylogenetic implications. In: Pakaluk J., Slipinski S.A. (eds). Biology, Phylogeny, and Classification of Coleoptera. Papers celebrating 80th Birthday of Roy A. Crowson. V. 2. Warszawa: Muzeum i Instytut Zoologii PAN, pp. 634–777.
Gratshev V.G., Zherikhin V.V. 2000. The weevils from the Late Cretaceous New Jersey amber (Coleoptera: Curculionoidea). In: Grimaldi D.A. (ed.). Studies on Fossils in Amber, with particular reference to the Cretaceous of New Jersey. Leiden: Backhuys Publ., pp. 241–254.
Gratshev V.G., Zherikhin V.V. 2003. The fossil record of weevils and related beetle families (Coleoptera, Curculionoidea). Acta zoologica cracoviensia 46 (suppl.-Fossil Insects): 129–138.
Zherikhin V.V., Gratshev V.G. 2004. Fossil curculionoid beetles (Coleoptera, Curculionoidea) from the Lower Cretaceous of Northeastern Brazil. Paleontological Journal 38 (5): 528–537.
Soriano C., Gratshev V.G., and Delclòs X. 2006. New Early Cretaceous weevils (Insecta, Coleoptera, Curculionoidea) from El Montsec, Spain. Cretaceous Research 27 (4): 555–564.
Anisyutkin L.N., Grachev V.G., Ponomarenko A.G., Rasnitsyn A.P., Vršanský P. 2008. Part II. Fossil Insects in the Cretaceous Mangrove Facies of Southern Negev, Israel. In: Krassilov V. and Rasnitsyn A., eds, Plant–arthropod interactions in the early angiosperm history. Evidence from the Cretaceous of Israel. Sofia-Moscow & Leiden-Boston: Pensoft Publishers & BRILL, pp. 189–223.
Gratshev V.G., Perkovsky E.E. 2008. New species of the genus Glaesotropis (Insecta: Coleoptera: Anthribidae) from Rovno amber. Paleontological Journal 42 (1): 60–62.

External links
Personal Web page
In memoriam
International Palaeoentomological Society

1963 births
2006 deaths
Russian paleontologists
Russian entomologists
Coleopterists
Moscow State Pedagogical University alumni
Soviet entomologists
Soviet paleontologists